Dead Again is a 1991 neo-noir romantic thriller film directed by Kenneth Branagh and written by Scott Frank. It stars Branagh and Emma Thompson, with Andy García, Derek Jacobi, Hanna Schygulla, Wayne Knight, and Robin Williams appearing in supporting roles.

Dead Again was a moderate box office success and received positive reviews from the majority of critics. Jacobi was nominated for a BAFTA Award for Best Actor in a Supporting Role, and Patrick Doyle, who composed the film's music, was nominated for a Golden Globe for Best Original Score.

Plot
Newspapers detail the 1948 murder of Margaret Strauss, who was stabbed during a robbery; her anklet is missing. Her husband, composer Roman Strauss, is found guilty of the crime and condemned to death. Before his execution, Roman is visited by reporter Gray Baker. Asked if he killed Margaret, Roman appears to whisper something in Baker's ear. Baker does not disclose Roman's answer.

Forty-three years later, private detective Mike Church investigates the identity of a woman who has appeared at the orphanage where he grew up. She has amnesia, cannot speak and has nightmares. Mike takes her in and asks his friend, Pete Dugan, to publish her picture and his contact info. Antiques dealer and hypnotist Franklyn Madson approaches Mike, suggesting hypnosis may help her recover her memory.

When the session is unsuccessful, Madson suggests they experiment with past life regression. Mike is skeptical, but the woman details Margaret and Roman's lives in third person, from courtship to their wedding. When the session ends, she can speak but still has amnesia. Madson shows them Life magazine articles covering the murder. Mike and the woman bear a striking resemblance to Roman and Margaret. Mike visits former psychiatrist Cozy Carlisle, who insists they continue to see Madson; delving into the problems between Margaret and Roman may resolve her amnesia.

Mike nicknames the woman "Grace", and falls in love with her. A man named Doug appears and claims she is his fiancée Katherine, but Mike discovers he is lying and chases him off. Hypnotized, Grace remembers that Roman suffered from writer's block and was broke despite the vestiges of his earlier wealth. He believes that Margaret is flirting with Baker, whom she met on their wedding day. Margaret cannot convince him she is faithful and catches Frankie, the son of their housekeeper Inga, looking through her jewelry box. She asks Roman to dismiss Inga but Roman refuses, saying that Inga saved his life in Nazi Germany.

Grace sees Mike standing over Margaret with scissors, and is convinced he intends to kill her. Mike insists that he would never hurt her, but when he accidentally calls her "Margaret", he agrees to let Madson regress him. During his regression, he realizes that he was Margaret and Grace was actually Roman, but is unable to tell Madson or Grace about this revelation.

Pete Dugan tells Mike that he has identified Grace as artist Amanda Sharp. Turns out she lost her memory due to getting mugged one night. Amanda/Grace, still afraid of Mike, accompanies Dugan and Madson to her apartment; her artwork focuses on scissors. Madson gives her a gun to protect herself from Mike. Mike visits Gray Baker in a nursing home and asks him about Roman's secret, but Baker insists that Roman said nothing to him but instead he leaned over and kissed him. Baker is convinced that Roman did not kill his wife and urges Mike to find Inga, who might know what truly happened.

Mike finds and questions Inga. She reveals that Madson is actually Frankie. One day on 1948, she declared her love to Roman but he rebuffed her. Frankie blamed Margaret for his mother's unhappiness and killed her with scissors, then stole her anklet. Roman later was found covered in his wife's blood and holding the murder weapon.

After Roman's execution, Inga took Frankie to London where he learned about hypnotherapy and past-life regression. After returning to LA, Frankie was convinced that Margaret's spirit would seek revenge. Seeing Amanda's photo in the paper, he knew she had returned. He hired Doug, an actor, to separate Mike and Amanda and distract Amanda while he waited to kill her. Inga apologizes for her role in Margaret's death and gives Mike the anklet. After Mike leaves to find Amanda, Frankie/Madson smothers Inga with a pillow.

Mike tries to tell Amanda the truth. Terrified, she shoots him. Madson arrives and reveals that he is Frankie. Amanda tries to shoot him as well, but the gun jams and he knocks her out. He puts the scissors he used to kill Margaret in Mike's hand and tries to make it look like Amanda killed him and committed suicide. Mike revives and stabs Madson in the leg with the scissors. In the ensuing struggle, Mike grabs the gun from Madson. Dugan arrives, misconstrues the scene and tackles Mike. As Madson reaches for the dropped pistol, Amanda stabs him in the back with the scissors. In a rage, Madson pulls the scissors out and charges at Mike, but Mike quickly positions Amanda's scissors sculpture so that Madson impales himself.

A closing montage shows Mike and Amanda embracing, superimposed over Margaret and Roman in happier times.

Cast

 Kenneth Branagh as Mike Church/Roman Strauss
 Emma Thompson as "Grace"/Amanda Sharp/Margaret Strauss
 Andy García as Gray Baker
 Derek Jacobi as Franklyn Madson
 Wayne Knight as "Piccolo" Pete Dugan
 Robin Williams as Dr. Cozy Carlisle
 Hanna Schygulla as Inga
 Campbell Scott as Doug
 Jo Anderson as Sister Madeleine/Masquerade Party Guest
 Lois Hall as Sister Constance
 Richard Easton as Father Timothy
 Gregor Hesse as Frankie
 Obba Babatundé as Sid
 Vasek Simek as Otto Kline
 Christine Ebersole as Lydia Larson 
 Raymond Cruz as supermarket clerk
 Miriam Margolyes as hypnotic subject in shop (uncredited)

Production

Dead Again is an international co-production between the United States and the United Kingdom. According to the director's commentary on the DVD, the movie was filmed entirely in color. After test screenings, it was decided to use black and white for the "past" sequences to help clear up audience confusion. The final frame, once the mystery is solved, blooms from black and white to color.

Release
Dead Again was released on August 23, 1991 in the United States and October 25, 1991 in the United Kingdom. It was later entered into the 42nd Berlin International Film Festival in February 1992.

Home media
The film was released on DVD on June 27, 2000 through Paramount Home Entertainment. The DVD Special Features include two audio commentaries and a theatrical trailer.

It was then released for the first time on Blu-ray on October 5, 2021; on the film's 30th anniversary.

Reception

Critical response
Dead Again was well received by most critics. On Rotten Tomatoes it has an approval rating of 82% based on reviews from 49 critics with the consensus: "Even if the somewhat convoluted plot falls apart upon close inspection, Dead Again proves Kenneth Branagh has a solid knack for enjoyable pulp." On Metacritic the film has a weighted average score of 66 out of 100, based on reviews from 19 critics. Audiences surveyed by CinemaScore gave the film a grade "A−" on scale of A to F.

Chicago Sun-Times film critic Roger Ebert gave the film a glowing four star review, drawing comparisons to the works of Orson Welles and Alfred Hitchcock, stating, "Dead Again is Kenneth Branagh once again demonstrating that he has a natural flair for bold theatrical gesture. If Henry V, the first film he directed and starred in, caused people to compare him to Olivier, Dead Again will inspire comparisons to Welles and Hitchcock - and the Olivier of Hitchcock's Rebecca. I do not suggest Branagh is already as great a director as Welles and Hitchcock, although he has a good start in that direction. What I mean is that his spirit, his daring, is in the same league. He is not interested in making timid movies." James Berardinelli also gave the film a four star review, praising Branagh's direction and all levels of the production, from the screenplay by Scott Frank to Patrick Doyle's score, stating, "...Branagh has combined all of these cinematic elements into an achievement that rivals Hitchcock's best work and stands out as one of the most intriguing and memorable thrillers of the 1990s."

Peter Travers of Rolling Stone viewed the film negatively, praising some elements of Branagh's direction while criticizing the romance, saying, "In his efforts to crowd the screen with character and incident, Branagh cheats on the one element that might have given resonance to the mystery: the love story. Branagh and Thompson (married in real life) are sublime actors, but they never develop a convincing ardor as either couple. How could they when the director is so busy playing tricks? Dead Again isn't a disaster, merely a miscalculation from a prodigious talent who has forgotten that you squeeze the life out of romance when you don't give it space to breathe."

Vincent Canby of The New York Times gave the film a lukewarm review, calling it "a big, convoluted, entertainingly dizzy romantic mystery melodrama" and concluding, "Dead Again is eventually a lot simpler than it pretends to be. The explanation of the mystery is a rather commonplace letdown, but probably nothing short of mass murder could successfully top the baroque buildup. In this way, too, the film is faithful to its antecedents, while still being a lot of fun."

In 2016, Jason Bailey at Flavorwire, repeated Roger Ebert's initial directorial comparisons, writing that, "Dead Again is one of the most Hitchcockian thrillers this side of De Palma, with easily traceable influences of Olivier-fronted Rebecca (in the creepy, needy housekeeper), Psycho (the mysterious old mother in the next room), Dial M for Murder (the scissors as murder weapon), and Spellbound (the therapeutic elements, plus a quickie reference to Salvador Dalí, who advised on that film’s dream sequences)".

Box office
Dead Again grossed $3,479,395 during its opening weekend, playing on 450 screens. It eventually grossed more than $38 million by the end of its theatrical run.

Accolades

Media 
Dead Again was one of several influences on the 1999 conceptual album, Metropolis pt. 2: Scenes From a Memory, by the American progressive metal band Dream Theater.

It was also unofficially remade into a 1998 Malayalam movie Mayilpeelikkavu and in 2008 as Sila Nerangalil.

References

External links
 

1991 films
1990s mystery thriller films
1990s romantic thriller films
American mystery thriller films
American romantic thriller films
British mystery thriller films
British thriller films
Films about amnesia
Films about reincarnation
Films directed by Kenneth Branagh
Films about hypnosis
Films partially in color
Films scored by Patrick Doyle
Films set in 1949
Films set in the 1990s
Films set in Los Angeles
Films shot in Los Angeles
Films with screenplays by Scott Frank
Paramount Pictures films
1990s English-language films
1990s American films
1990s British films